The following is a list of characters in the manga series The Candidate for Goddess by Yukiru Sugisaki.

Goddess Candidates

Zero Enna

Repairer: Kizna Towryk
Candidate Number: 88
 (his real name "Rei" is the kanji representing number 0) lost his father when he was very young and was raised by his mother in a remote colony. Cheerful and optimistic to the extreme, Zero hides his fears and refuses to ever be depressed. His straightforward and optimistic personality sometimes grates on others. A bit thickheaded, he's not the smartest candidate, but he can move with the best of them. His piloting abilities are like carbon that hasn't yet been formed into a diamond. Zero has not yet mastered his EX.

Hiead Gner

Repairer: Ikhny Allecto
Candidate Number: 87
 was orphaned in the war and forced to suffer many hardships, but has a strong hatred for anyone raised in comfort. Cold and seemingly emotionless, he doesn't trust anyone or anything, especially Zero. These rivals share the same EX abilities.

Clay Cliff Fortran

Repairer: Saki Mimori
Candidate Number: 89
 is the class brain and came to the G.O.A. not to be a pilot, but to study and theorize. Interested in many different subjects. His catch phrase is "Very interesting." He slowly developing EX abilities.

Roose Sawamura

Repairer: Wrecka Toesing
Candidate Number: 85
 used to be chubby but his Repairer, Wrecka, put him under a rigorous diet that apparently made him slim. He seems to have some feelings for her. It is revealed that is rapid weight loss was actually due to his EX ability to shapeshift. In vol.5 of the manga, he contemplates strangling Zero in his sleep and use his EX to take his place, believing it was his best chance to remain a pilot candidate.

Yamagi Kushida

Repairer: Tukasa Kuscha
Candidate Number: 86
 lived in a colony that was closed down and no one lives there anymore, but he still dreams about his family living there and, worried about him, awaiting his return. He wants to become a Pilot to protect people, so they won't have to experience the same dreams as he.

Force Wartlliam

Candidate Number: 01
 paired up with Hiead in the training to master the basics of the Pro-Ing. After the teams were separated, Hiead challenged him to a duel and, as result of Hiead's EX going rampant, he got badly hurt.

Aracd Narocke

Candidate Number: 04
 paired up with Clay in the training to master the basics of the Pro-Ing and fought against Zero and Erts' pair. His objective was to defeat Erts, the best of the five top pilots, but Zero got in his way.

Erts Virny Cocteau

Candidate Number: 05
Ingrid: Reneighd Klein (renamed from Luhma Klein)
Repairer: Tune Youg
 is the best of five top pilots. Orphaned very young and forced to enter the G.O.A., Erts is gentle and doesn't like to fight. His grades are very good and Erts is Zero's friend. Erts has an older brother that is a pilot, Ernest Cuore. He later becomes a Goddess Pilot in his brother's place.

Repairer Cadets

Kizna Towryk

 is the personal Repairer for the practice Ingrid Zero pilots. Kizna wants to be Zero's equal, and not inferior to him. She wanted to be a Goddess Pilot, but couldn't because of the males only rule and she was forced to become a Repairer instead. She sometimes resented Zero because he gets to be a pilot and not her. Sometimes, Kizna talks like a man, but because of her rational personality, the other mechanic girls in her class look up to her. She has dexterous fingers and makes an excellent mechanic. She really likes sweet things. Kizna has artificial cat ears because in her childhood, she had an accident that damaged her ears. Kizna tries to hide her ears, but Zero exposed them. She ran off feeling ashamed. However, she eventually overcomes her fear and she learn to be proud of her of appearance.

Ikhny Allecto

 is Hiead Gner's Repairer. Timid and seemingly low in self-confidence, Ikhny is gifted in repair and seeks acceptance from the brutal Hiead, even to the point of once sabotaging Zero's Pro-ING. Kizna found out about the sabotage, and she tries to comfort her.

Tsukasa Kuscha

 is Yamagi Kushida's Repairer.

Wrecka Toesing

 is Roose Sawamura's Repairer.

Saki Mimori

 is Clay Cliff Fortran's Repairer.

Kyoko Farley

Yukine Simmons

Rome Lotte

 is Erts Virny Cocteau's Repairer. She had to drop her position when Erts became a Goddess Pilot and chose to carry his brother's will.

Goddess Pilots

Teela Zain Elmes

Ingrid: Ernn Laties
Repairer: none
 is the best of the five Goddesses and the only female pilot. Faithful to her task, Teela's fighting ability is frighteningly high. Nearly flawless, there are times when no one quite knows what she's thinking. Seeking perfection, she won't let herself feel the emotions of daily life. Her outward appearance has hardly changed since she saved the ten-year-old Zero, but no one knows why. Always the top of the pilots, Teela has two EX. One is the same ability as Zero's. The other is the ability to control other Ingrids.

Gareas Elidd

Ingrid: Eeva Leena
Repairer: Leena Fujimura
 is the second best of the five Goddesses and is in charge of attacking. When he's in the right mood, Gareas has matchless strength; when he's not, he can't hit the broad side of a barn. He doesn't like Teela (since she took his position as top pilot). Strong, quick-tempered, and violent, he has a nasty way of speaking and acting and is constantly ignoring orders. Gareas is a womanizer who's always competing with Rio. The oldest of the pilots, he has a relatively strong build. Despite their vast differences, Gareas is good friends with Ernest.

Rioroute Vilgyna

Ingrid: Agui Keameia
Repairer: Philphleora Deed
 is what's called a cheerful idiot, even though he has a rather arrogant personality. But he's easily the most gentle pilot and most easily moved to tears. Quite the flirt, he is always competing with Gareas. He seems like a player, but he secretly only likes his mechanic, Philphleora. Rio recognizes Teela as the leader. He tends to say, "--ssu." A contraction of "desu" which indicates he's not showing as much respect as he should. Rio's body is fit and toned. He's the fourth in a big family. His little brother, is expected to soon enter G.O.A.

Yu Hikura

Ingrid: Tellia Kallisto
Repairer: Kazuhi Hikura
 is quiet and usually emotionless, but quite strong-willed. Like Gareas, he is also in charge of attacking. Because of his calm judgment, the other pilots have great trust in him (his skills are also top notch). He has a rather young face and light complexion, and has a small build. There are rumors to the effect that, while enrolled in G.O.A., he nearly killed his instructor. When his home colony was attack by Giseisha, he and his sister Kazuhi were rescued by the previous five Goddesses. To him, the most precious thing is his only family, his little sister.

Ernest Cuore

Ingrid: Luhma Klein
Repairer: Tune Youg
 is submissive and kind to everyone, but has a complicated side that, while being lonely, likes his solitude. With his polite, careful way of speaking, Ernest is always the mediator if something bad happens between the Candidates. His EX is telepathy, which has caused a hard time for him when associating with others. But after meeting Gareas at G.O.A., he started to look at things positively. Ernest dislikes his EX and often wonders why he has it. In battle, he uses his EX to support the Ingrids so they can fight with 120% of their power, as well as being in charge of operations. Erts is his little brother.

Repairers

Leena Fujimura

 is Gareas Elidd's Goddess Repairer. Her name is the same as Gareas' Ingrid, and seems to worry and care a lot about him.

Philphleora Deed

 is Rioroute Vilgyna's Goddess Repairer. She cares a lot about Rio, even though she doesn't let it show and says she worries much more about Agui Keameia, his Ingrid.

Tune Youg

 is Ernest Cuore's Goddess Repairer and also is in love with him. Apparently, she was jealous of Ernest and Gareas' relationship. As said in episode 8, even though her heart was only filled with thoughts of Ernest, he wouldn't look at her at all and would open his heart only to Gareas. She later becomes Erts Virny Cocteau's Goddess Repairer, losing the opportunity to tell Ernest how she really felt about him.

Kazuhi Hikura

 is Yu Hikura's Goddess Repairer and also his sister. She doesn't like rough people, and said so to Rio when he tried to flirt with her.

G.O.A. Personnel

Azuma Hijikata

 is the captain of the transports and sometimes is the scary instructor who shows Candidates the right way. He is the one responsible for personally training Zero, Hiead, Clay, Yamagi and Roose. He's a smoker and also a very serious person, but also somewhat hot headed, and seems to hate when people call him "old man". He is the top instructor in G.O.A., a first class.

Dr. Rill Croford

, also called Madonna in White, is the main doctor at the medical station.

Dr. Kuro Rivolde

Headmaster

 is the headmaster of the school.

Lists of anime and manga characters